Prunus conadenia is a species of cherry found in Tibet, Gansu, Guizhou, Henan, Qinghai, Shaanxi, Sichuan and Yunnan provinces of China. A shrubby tree 6 to 10m tall, it prefers to grow in mountain valleys between 2,100 and 3,600m above sea level. The people of Shangri-La eat its fruit, and Tibetan people burn its wood in the weisang purification ritual.

References

conadenia
Cherries
Endemic flora of China
Flora of Qinghai
Flora of South-Central China
Flora of Southeast China
Flora of Tibet
Plants described in 1912